Alice Jeanne LaDuke (born June 27, 1938) is an American  mathematician who specialized in mathematical analysis and the history of mathematics. She was also a child actress who appeared in one film (The Green Promise).

Early life and film career
LaDuke was raised on a farm in Posey County, in southwest Indiana. Her parents were college-educated and an aunt who taught mathematics in Chicago frequently visited, bringing mathematics puzzles for LaDuke.

As a child, she was cast from a field of 12,000 4-H members to play a small part in The Green Promise (1948) as farm girl Jessie Wexford, the sister of Natalie Wood's character's love interest. Wood and LaDuke shared a tutor who taught them both string games as well as their school curriculum.

Education
LaDuke studied mathematics at DePauw University in the 1950s, and roomed with another mathematics major from Oregon, who showed her the state on summer camping trips.

She earned a master's degree in mathematics, but was unable to obtain a teaching position with it because the schools she applied to only hired men. She returned to Oregon in 1966 as a doctoral student at the University of Oregon, and completed her Ph.D. in 1969 with a dissertation in mathematical analysis supervised by Kenneth A. Ross on Ep Space: Essentially a Product of Cp Spaces.

Mathematics career
After completing her doctorate, LaDuke spent the following thirty years as a faculty member of the department of mathematical sciences at DePaul University. She retired in 2003.

With Judy Green, she is the author of Pioneering Women in American Mathematics: The Pre-1940 PhD’s (American Mathematical Society and London Mathematical Society, 2009). An annual lecture series on Women in Mathematics, Science, and Technology at DePaul is named after her.

References

External links

1938 births
Living people
People from Posey County, Indiana
American child actresses
20th-century American mathematicians
American women mathematicians
Mathematical analysts
American historians of mathematics
DePauw University alumni
University of Oregon alumni
DePaul University faculty
20th-century women mathematicians